The 1982 Sacramento State Hornets football team represented California State University, Sacramento as a member of the Northern California Athletic Conference (NCAC) during the 1982 NCAA Division II football season. Led by fifth-year head coach Bob Mattos, Sacramento State compiled an overall record of 8–3 with a mark of 3–2 in conference play, tying for second place in the NCAC. The team outscored its opponents 249 to 243 for the season. The Hornets played home games at Hornet Stadium in Sacramento, California.

Schedule

Team players in the NFL
The following Sacramento State players were selected in the 1983 NFL Draft.

References

Sacramento State
Sacramento State Hornets football seasons
Sacramento State Hornets football